Tomorrow's Hits may refer to:
 Tomorrow's Hits (The Men album)
 Tomorrow's Hits (Vee-Jay Records album)